Ilan Kapoor (born 1959) is a professor of Critical Development Studies at the Faculty of Environmental and Urban Change at York University in Toronto, Ontario, Canada. He is an influential postcolonial scholar, considered one of the first to bring both psychoanalysis and postcolonial analysis to the field of Development Studies. He is the author of five books and numerous articles on postcolonial politics, psychoanalysis, participatory development, and celebrity humanitarianism.

Work on participation 
Kapoor first came to prominence in the early 2000s through a series of influential journal articles on participatory development (the practice of involving beneficiaries of international development programs in decision-making).  Kapoor is critical of such a practice, arguing that while it looks noble and promising (when adopted by the World Bank or any other international agency), it is often an excuse to further neoliberal policies, and can even result in authoritarian and exclusionary practices. In 2004, Kapoor's critique helped frame an issue of Current Issues in Comparative Education (published at Columbia University).

Work on postcolonialism 
Kapoor's 2008 book, The Postcolonial Politics of Development, is a collection of essays written between 2002-2007. The book is one of the first to analyze development issues from a postcolonial perspective. It has received many positive reviews. Kapoor examines recent international development policy areas (governance, human/gender rights, participation), carrying out a cultural and political economy critique of them. He argues that development practitioners and westernized elites are often complicit in perpetuating contemporary forms of imperialism. The book concludes by arguing for the need for a radical self-reflexivity on the part of development workers, institutions and academics; while at the same time emphasizing the political strategies of marginalized groups that can lead to greater democratic dialogue.

Ilan Kapoor is the brother of artist Anish Kapoor. The latter has designed the book covers for Kapoor's 2008, 2020 and 2021 books.

In September 2017, Kapoor resigned as editorial board member of the journal Third World Quarterly (along with roughly half of the journal's editorial board members) in protest against the journal publishing an article making a "case for colonialism."

Work on celebrity humanitarianism 
Kapoor's book, Celebrity Humanitarianism: The Ideology of Global Charity (2012), is one of the first to critically assess the relatively new phenomenon of global celebrity philanthropy (by the likes of Bono, Geldof, Angelina Jolie, Madonna, Bill Gates, George Soros). The author carries out a stinging critique of celebrity charity work and corporate philanthropy. He shows how this charity is not just self-promoting, but also helps justify and worsen the global inequality brought about by capitalism. Kapoor also draws attention to what he sees as a new phenomenon of "spectacular NGOs," not-for-profit development organizations such as Save Darfur or Medecins Sans Frontieres (Doctors Without Borders) that don’t just get celebrity endorsements but seek out celebrity status themselves. He takes them to task for being more interested in branding, spectacle and short-term results than addressing broader and long-term problems of social inequality and political inclusion.

Work on psychoanalytic politics 
Kapoor's books, Confronting Desire: Psychoanalysis and International Development (2020) and Psychoanalysis and the GlObal (2018), investigate how the unconscious "speaks out" in various guises: from obsessions about growth and poverty to the perverse seductions of racism and over-consumption, from disavowal of the climate crisis to the social and cultural traumas engendered by globalization. For Kapoor, the unpredictability and excess of unconscious desire are not only the source of "irrationality" but also a political resource for breaking out of the global capitalist status quo. He examines, for example, the political and psychoanalytic bases of revolutionary movements such as the Arab Spring.

Kapoor's book Universal Politics (2021), co-authored with Zahi Zalloua, argues for a negative universality rooted in social antagonism (shared experiences of marginalization) and envisions a common solidarity of the excluded. For the authors, such a conception of universality avoids the trap of neocolonial universalism and the narrow particularism of identity politics. The book examines what a universal politics could look like in such key current global sites of struggle as climate change, workers' struggles, the Palestinian question, the refugee crisis, Black Lives Matter, #MeToo, political Islam, Morales's universalist state in Bolivia, the European Union, and COVID-19.

References

External links
Personal Website
Faculty Profile at York University
 Academia.edu Profile
 Kapoor-Wheeler debate, "Should celebrities promote charities?" in New Internationalist 1 September 2012

1959 births
Living people
Canadian Jews
Canadian people of Indian descent
Academic staff of York University
Environmental studies scholars